William Connellan was an Irish harper. He was born in Cloonamahon, County Sligo.

Connellan was a harper, who may or may not have composed the tune Caoineach Luimnigh (the lament for Limerick). He was well known in Scotland, where he travelled extensively. There his version of Luimnigh became Lochabar No More. He is also credited with Love's A Tormenting Pain,  and probably Killiecrankie. His brother was the composer Thomas Connellan.

Arthur O'Neill (1734-1818) refers to William in his memoirs:

 I heard much of his brother William Connellan, who was a famous harper and a fine composer. He died in the county of Waterford.

References

 The Harpers Connellan:Irish Music of the late 17th century - The life and times of the Sligo harpers William and Thomas Connellan, Kathleen Loughnane, 2009, ISMN 979 0 9002013 3 1.

Irish harpists
Irish composers
Musicians from County Sligo
17th-century Irish people